Parliamentary elections in Slovenia for member seats of National Assembly of Slovenia have been regularly held since first democratic elections in 1990.

Participation 
At all democratic elections since 1990.

Winners 
All democratic winning parties in National Assembly of Slovenia since 1990.

Voting system
There are 8 main voting units, each unit further divided into 11 separate electoral districts. That is how we get 88 regular members of parliament in total, one voted from each district.

2 additional members of Italian and Hungarian minority form total 90 seats. For coalition to constitute the government, they need at least 46 regular members, two minority members don't count.

References

Parliamentary elections in Slovenia